Trewavas is a surname. Notable people with the surname include:

Anthony Trewavas (born 1939), British professor
Ethelwynn Trewavas, British ichthyologist
Joseph Trewavas, British Victoria Cross recipient
Pete Trewavas, British bass guitarist, member of neo-progressive rock band Marillion